Ignao is a village located in the commune of Lago Ranco in Los Ríos Region, southern Chile.

The name is said to originate from a Mapudungun corruption/clipping of the Spanish name Ignacio.

References

Geography of Los Ríos Region
Populated places in Ranco Province